Club Deportivo Puerto Roquetas, also known as Roquetas, is a Spanish football team based in Roquetas de Mar, in the autonomous community of Andalusia. Founded in 1970, it currently plays in Primera Andaluza – Group 4, holding home games at Estadio Antonio Peroles, with a capacity of 9,000 seats.

Season to season

4 seasons in Segunda División B
20 seasons in Tercera División

Notable players
  Juan Luis Guirado
 Esteban

External links
Official website 
Futbolme team profile 
Lapreferente profile 

Association football clubs established in 1970
Football clubs in Andalusia
Divisiones Regionales de Fútbol clubs
1970 establishments in Spain